Stormy Monday Blues is an album by blues guitarist/vocalist T-Bone Walker released by the BluesWay label in 1968.

Reception

AllMusic reviewer Steve Leggett stated: "The high level of creativity in play here isn't obvious on a cursory listen, since a lot of the tracks favor the same sort of midtempo blues shuffle, but a closer listen reveals a stunning guitarist who plays the blues with a jazzman's soul, and while Walker isn't a flashy singer, he gets the job done with enough conviction that you can feel the country dust settling in behind his urbane delivery, and when he cuts loose a little on guitar, the sparks fly with elegant tension. The highlight here, of course, is Walker's umpteenth version of "Stormy Monday Blues," a track he originally recorded way back in 1947, giving the world a bona fide blues classic, and if he revisits it again here, that's fine".

Track listing
All compositions by T-Bone Walker except where noted
 "I'm Gonna Stop This Nite Life" (Grover McDaniel) – 3:25
 "Little Girl, Don't You Know" (McDaniel) – 4:45
 "Every Night I Have to Cry" (McDaniel) – 2:45
 "I'm Still in Love with You" – 3:29
 "Cold Hearted Woman" (McDaniel) – 2:30
 "Treat Me So Down Low" – 2:35
 "Stormy Monday" – 2:20
 "Confusion Blues" (McDaniel) – 2:50
 "I Gotta Break Baby" – 2:25
 "Flower Blues" – 2:41

Personnel
T-Bone Walker – guitar, vocals
Mel Moore, Preston Love – trumpet
John "Streamline" Ewing – trombone
McKinley Johnson – alto saxophone 
Mel Jernigan – tenor saxophone
John Williams  – baritone saxophone
Mel Brown – guitar
Lloyd Glenn – piano
Ron Brown – Fender bass
Paul Humphrey – drums

References

T-Bone Walker albums
1968 albums
BluesWay Records albums
Albums produced by Bob Thiele